This is a list of 203 species in Peromyia, a genus of wood midges in the family Cecidomyiidae.

Peromyia species

Peromyia abdita Jaschhof, 2009
Peromyia aberrans Mamaev, 1963
Peromyia abnormis Mamaev & Berest, 1990
Peromyia acuminata Jaschhof, 2017
Peromyia acutula Jaschhof, 2001
Peromyia aeratipennis (Skuse, 1888)
Peromyia albicornis (Meigen, 1830)
Peromyia aleemkhani Jaschhof, 2001
Peromyia ampla Jaschhof, 2001
Peromyia anatina Mamaev & Berest, 1990
Peromyia angellifera Jaschhof, 1997
Peromyia angulata Jaschhof, 2001
Peromyia angulosa Jaschhof, 2017
Peromyia angustior Jaschhof, 2017
Peromyia anisotoma Mamaev, 1994
Peromyia anocellata Jaschhof, 2001
Peromyia apposita Jaschhof, 1997
Peromyia appositoides Jaschhof, 2017
Peromyia assimilis Jaschhof, 2020
Peromyia aurantiaca (Kieffer, 1894)
Peromyia austrina Jaschhof, 2001
Peromyia autumnalis Jaschhof, 2001
Peromyia avia Jaschhof, 2001
Peromyia ayaensis Jaschhof, 2001
Peromyia bashfordi Jaschhof, 2010
Peromyia bavarica Jaschhof, 2009
Peromyia bengalensis Kieffer, 1905
Peromyia bertviklundi Jaschhof, 2009
Peromyia bicolor Edwards, 1938
Peromyia bidentata Berest, 1988
Peromyia bihamata Mamaev & Zaitzev, 1997
Peromyia borealis (Felt, 1920)
Peromyia boreojaponica Jaschhof, 2001
Peromyia boreophila Jaschhof, 2001
Peromyia brandenburgensis Jaschhof, 2017
Peromyia brevispina Yukawa, 1967
Peromyia brutostylata Jaschhof, 2017
Peromyia capitata Jaschhof, 2001
Peromyia caricis (Kieffer, 1901)
Peromyia carinata Jaschhof, 2001
Peromyia cassa Jaschhof, 2001
Peromyia clandestina Jaschhof, 2004
Peromyia centrosa Jaschhof, 2001
Peromyia cinalata Jaschhof, 2010
Peromyia clancula Jaschhof, 2009
Peromyia clavata Jaschhof, 2017
Peromyia cognata Jaschhof, 2017
Peromyia composita Jaschhof, 1997
Peromyia concitata Mamaev & Berest, 1994
Peromyia consimilis Jaschhof, 2017
Peromyia constricta Jaschhof, 2017
Peromyia cornuta (Edwards, 1938)
Peromyia culta Jaschhof, 2004
Peromyia curta Jaschhof, 1997
Peromyia curvostylata Jaschhof, 2017
Peromyia debilis Jaschhof, 2010
Peromyia denotata Jaschhof, 2009
Peromyia derupta Jaschhof, 2004
Peromyia despecta Jaschhof, 2010
Peromyia devia Jaschhof, 2017
Peromyia diadema Mamaev, 1963
Peromyia didhami Jaschhof, 2004
Peromyia directa Jaschhof, 1997
Peromyia discreta Jaschhof, 1997
Peromyia dissona Jaschhof, 2004
Peromyia doci Jaschhof, 2004
Peromyia dupla Jaschhof, 2017
Peromyia edwardsi Berest, 1994
Peromyia elongatula Jaschhof & Jaschhof, 2020
Peromyia extensa Berest, 1991
Peromyia fagiphila Jaschhof, 1997
Peromyia fibyensis Jaschhof, 2009
Peromyia fujiensis Jaschhof, 2001
Peromyia fungicola (Kieffer, 1898)
Peromyia galapagensis Jaschhof, 2004
Peromyia gemella Jaschhof, 2001
Peromyia gotohi Jaschhof, 2001
Peromyia gracilostylata Jaschhof, 2017
Peromyia grovei Jaschhof, 2010
Peromyia gryphiswaldensis Jaschhof, 1997
Peromyia horridula Jaschhof, 1997
Peromyia hyalina Jaschhof, 2017
Peromyia ibarakiensis Jaschhof, 2001
Peromyia imperatoria Jaschhof, 2001
Peromyia impexa (Skuse, 1888)
Peromyia indecorata Jaschhof, 2010
Peromyia indica Grover, 1970
Peromyia inflata Jaschhof, 2017
Peromyia insueta Jaschhof, 2004
Peromyia intecta Jaschhof, 2004
Peromyia intermedia (Kieffer, 1895)
Peromyia intonsa Jaschhof, 2004
Peromyia iuxtatruncata Jaschhof, 2017
Peromyia karstroemi Jaschhof, 2017
Peromyia katieae Jaschhof, 2004
Peromyia lapponica Jaschhof, 2017
Peromyia latebrosa Jaschhof, 2004
Peromyia leveillei Kieffer, 1894
Peromyia lindstroemi Jaschhof & Jaschhof, 2020
Peromyia lippertae Jaschhof, 2017
Peromyia lisatengoe Jaschhof, 2017
Peromyia lobata Yukawa, 1971
Peromyia lobuscorum Jaschhof, 2001
Peromyia longistylata Jaschhof, 2017
Peromyia maetoi Jaschhof, 2001
Peromyia manca Jaschhof, 2017
Peromyia mediterranea Mamaev, 1998
Peromyia memoranda Jaschhof, 2004
Peromyia menzeli Jaschhof, 2009
Peromyia mica Mamaev & Zaitzev, 1998
Peromyia minutissima Mamaev, 1963
Peromyia mitrata Jaschhof, 1997
Peromyia miyazakiensis Jaschhof, 2001
Peromyia modesta (Felt, 1907)
†Peromyia monilifera (Meunier, 1904)
Peromyia monilis Mamaev, 1965
Peromyia monticorvina Jaschhof, 2017
Peromyia montivaga Jaschhof, 2001
Peromyia mountalbertiensis Jaschhof, 2004
Peromyia multifurcata Jaschhof, 2004
Peromyia neglecta Jaschhof, 2017
Peromyia nemorum (Edwards, 1938)
Peromyia neomexicana (Felt, 1913)
Peromyia niederhofensis Jaschhof, 2017
Peromyia nitoda Jaschhof, 2010
Peromyia novaezelandiae Jaschhof, 2004
Peromyia obesa Jaschhof, 2001
Peromyia obunca Jaschhof, 2004
Peromyia oelandica Jaschhof, 2017
Peromyia ogawaensis Jaschhof, 2001
Peromyia okochii Jaschhof, 2001
Peromyia ombergensis Jaschhof, 2017
Peromyia orientalis Grover, 1964
Peromyia ornata Jaschhof, 2001
Peromyia ovalis (Edwards, 1938)
Peromyia penicillata Jaschhof, 1997
Peromyia perardua Jaschhof, 2004
Peromyia perpusilla (Winnterz, 1870)
Peromyia pertrita Jaschhof, 2004
Peromyia photophila (Felt, 1907)
Peromyia pilosa Jaschhof, 2001
Peromyia plena Jaschhof, 2004
Peromyia praeclara Jaschhof, 2004
Peromyia prominens Yukawa, 1967
Peromyia pseudoborealis Jaschhof, 2017
Peromyia pumila Jaschhof, 2001
Peromyia pumiloides Jaschhof, 2017
Peromyia puncta Jaschhof, 2001
Peromyia quercinophila Jaschhof, 2017
Peromyia ramosa (Edwards, 1938)
Peromyia ramosoides Jaschhof, 2009
Peromyia rara Jaschhof, 2004
Peromyia revelata Mamaev & Berest, 1990
Peromyia rhombica Jaschhof, 2001
Peromyia rotoitiensis Jaschhof, 2004
Peromyia ryukyuensis Jaschhof, 2001
Peromyia sacculiformia Mamaev & Berest, 1990
Peromyia sanguinea (Kieffer, 1894)
Peromyia scirrhosa Jaschhof, 2009
Peromyia scutellata Mamaev, 1990
Peromyia semota Jaschhof, 2001
Peromyia semotoides Jaschhof, 2009
Peromyia sera Jaschhof, 2004
Peromyia serrata Jaschhof, 2004
Peromyia setosa Jaschhof, 2004
Peromyia seychellensis (Kieffer, 1911)
Peromyia simpla Jaschhof, 2001
Peromyia simulans Jaschhof, 2017
Peromyia sinuosa Jaschhof, 2004
Peromyia sofielundensis Jaschhof & Jaschhof, 2020
Peromyia sororia Jaschhof & Jaschhof, 2017
Peromyia sphenoides Jaschhof, 2001
Peromyia spinigera Jaschhof, 2004
Peromyia spinosa Jaschhof, 2001
Peromyia squamigera Jaschhof, 2004
Peromyia stenshuvudensis Jaschhof, 2017
Peromyia subanatina Mamaev & Zaitzev, 1997
Peromyia subbicolor Jaschhof, 2009
Peromyia subborealis Jaschhof, 1997
Peromyia subcurta Jaschhof, 2001
Peromyia suberis Jaschhof, 1997
Peromyia syltefjordensis Jaschhof, 1996
Peromyia tasmanica Jaschhof, 2010
Peromyia tecta Jaschhof, 2004
Peromyia tenella Jaschhof, 2001
Peromyia trifida Jaschhof, 2001
Peromyia trifidoides Jaschhof, 2017
Peromyia trimera (Edwards, 1938)
Peromyia tripuncta Jaschhof, 2001
Peromyia truncata Yukawa, 1967
Peromyia tschirnhausi Jaschhof, 1996
Peromyia tsukubasanensis Jaschhof, 2001
Peromyia tumida Jaschhof, 2004
Peromyia tundrae Jaschhof, 1996
Peromyia uleforsi Jaschhof, 2017
Peromyia uniseriata Jaschhof, 2017
Peromyia upupoides Jaschhof, 1997
Peromyia valens Jaschhof, 2001
Peromyia vernalis Jaschhof, 2001
Peromyia viklundi Jaschhof, 1997
Peromyia warraensis Jaschhof, 2010
Peromyia yezoensis Jaschhof, 2001

References

Peromyia
Peromyia